Everything is the debut album by British pop duo Climie Fisher, released in February 1988. The album includes the duo's biggest hit and best-remembered single, "Love Changes (Everything)", and reached #14 on the UK Albums Chart. Their song "Room to Move" was remade by the group Animotion on their 1989 self-titled album.

The song "Love Changes (Everything)" was used in the movie How I Got into College.

In 2009, the record company Edsel re-released and remastered both Climie Fisher albums, and included all the original B-sides, with the notable exception of the original version of "Love Like a River".

Track listing

Singles 

 "Keeping the Mystery Alive" (Germany #35)
 "Rise to the Occasion" [Hip-Hop Mix] (Netherlands #1, South Africa #1, UK #10, Germany #14, Sweden #17)
 "Love Changes (Everything)" (UK #2, South Africa #2, Germany #7, Switzerland #8, Australia #23, USA #23)
 "This Is Me" (UK #22, Netherlands #34, Germany #60)
 "I Won't Bleed for You" (UK #35)

Personnel

Climie Fisher
 Simon Climie – lead vocals and backing vocals
 Rob Fisher – synthesizers and drum machine

Additional musicians
 Neil Taylor – electric guitar
 Pino Palladino – bass
 John Read – bass
 David Palmer – drums
 Steve Ferrone – drums
 Mel Gaynor – drums
 Coral Gordon – backing vocals
 The Soultanas – backing vocals
 View From the Hill – backing vocals
 Kirsty McColl – backing vocals

Production
 Tracks 1-5 produced by Stephen Hague; Track 2 co-produced by Climie Fisher.  Recording Engineers – Bob Kraushaar and Mike Ging (Track 1); David Jacobs (Tracks 2-5); John Gallen (Track 2).  Mixing – Bob Clearmountain (Track 1); Julian Mendelsohn (Track 3).
 Tracks 6-11 produced by Steve Lillywhite. Recording and Mix Engineers – David Palmer (Tracks 6 & 7); Mark Palmer (Tracks 9-11).

Additional Credits
 Recorded at Townhouse Studios, Mayfair Studios, Eel Pie Studios, Advision Studios, Rooster Studios and Sarm West Studios (London, England, UK); Sigma Sound Studios (New York, NY, USA).
 Design – Bill Smith Design 
 Photography – Carrie Branovan

Chart performance

Certifications

References

Climie Fisher albums
1988 debut albums
Albums produced by Steve Lillywhite
Albums produced by Stephen Hague
Albums produced by Simon Climie